Husein Alicajic is an Australian filmmaker who writes and directs for film and television, known for award-winning commercials for Foxtel.

Background
Born in Sydney, Australia, to a Bosnian father and a Scottish mother, Alicajic attended Newington College (1983–88). He attained degrees in Economics (Hons), Philosophy and Communications before deciding to become a filmmaker.

Career
With director Alex Proyas, Alicajic created a pre-trailer for the 20th Century Fox film I, Robot. In 2008, while with Arithmetic, Alicajic produced a campaign for Foxtel, winning a gold Promax Award. In 2009 he moved from Arithmetic and joined Photoplay.

Alicajic collaborated with UK writer Jeff Noon on his IF award-winning script Divine Shadows, which is currently in pre-production for shooting to begin in 2010. As part of a two-picture deal Alicajic has also signed to direct the AMPAS Nicholl Fellowship winning feature screenplay The Secret Boy.

Partial filmography
The Red Room (1997)
Beginnings (2002)
Still Life (2005/IV)
Harry the Hunchback (2005)
Aquamarine (2006)

Awards and nominations
2002, Won Dendy Award for 'Best Short Film' Beginnings at the Sydney Film Festival
2005, Won Inside Film Award for 'Best Unproduced Screenplay' Divine Shadows.
2008, Won Promax Award for 'Best in Show Gold' for his Foxtel Summer campaign
2009, Won Golden Trailer Award for 'Best Unproduced Movie Trailer'
2011, Won  New York Festivals World's Best TV & Films for 'Best Direction' Gold World Medal
2015, Won  Best Ads for 'Best TV Campaign' MND Australia: The Fading Symphony
2016, Highly Commended Australian Directors' Guild for 'Best Direction in a TV Commercial'
2016, Short List Cannes Lions International Festival of Creativity for 'Film Craft' MND Australia: The Fading Symphony
2016, Short List Clio Awards for 'Film Technique' MND Australia: The Fading Symphony
2016, Won Ciclope Festival Silver for 'Adapted Music' MND Australia: The Fading Symphony'
2017, Nominated Australian Directors' Guild for 'Best Direction of Commercial Content'
2017, Silver AWARD Award for 'Film & Video - Charity' MND Australia: The Fading Symphony'
2017, Finalist  New York Festivals For the Worlds Best Advertising for PSA 'MND Australia: The Fading Symphony'
2018, Finalist  Australian Directors' Guild for 'Best Direction in a TV Commercial'
2019, Finalist Association of Independent Commercial Producers 'Commercial Directors Diversity Program'
2020, Winner Australian Directors' Guild for 'Best Direction of an Online Drama Series'

References

External links
Husein Alicajic at the Internet Movie Database
Official Website

Living people
People from Sydney
People educated at Newington College
Australian people of Bosnia and Herzegovina descent
Australian people of Scottish descent
Australian film directors
Australian people of Bosniak descent
Year of birth missing (living people)